Simon Wolf (October 28, 1836 – June 4, 1923) was a United States businessman, lawyer, writer, diplomat and Jewish activist.

Biography
Wolf was born in Hinzweiler, Kingdom of Bavaria. He emigrated to the United States in 1848, making his home in Uhrichsville, Ohio. For several years, he followed business pursuits, but began to read law, and graduated from the Ohio Law College in Cleveland in 1861. He was admitted to the bar in Mount Vernon, Ohio, that same year. He opened a practice in New Philadelphia, Ohio, where he remained a year.

In 1862 he went to Washington, D.C., and opened a law office. In 1869, he was appointed by President Ulysses S. Grant, recorder of deeds for the District of Columbia, holding that office until May 1878. In July 1881, he received the post of consul general in Egypt, which he resigned in May 1882.  He made friendships with presidents Abraham Lincoln, Ulysses S. Grant, William McKinley and Woodrow Wilson.

He was active in Jewish charitable and educational movements, and was a frequent lecturer on social, literary, and political topics. He was the founder and president of the Hebrew Orphans' Home at Atlanta, Georgia, and president of the Board of Children's Guardians, Washington. Wolf was a prominent freemason, member of Lafayette lodge, No. 19, of Washington, D.C. He was very active in the Independent Order B'nai B'rith, of which he was president from 1903 to 1905.

He died from heart disease in Atlantic City, New Jersey on June 4, 1923.

Legacy
Wolf's daughter was the painter Florence Wolf Gotthold.

Works
 The Influence of the Jews on the Progress of the World. Washington, D.C. 1888
 The American Jew as Patriot, Soldier, and Citizen. Philadelphia, 1895.
 Mordecai Manuel Noah: A Biographical Sketch. Philadelphia, 1897.
 "Biographical Sketch of Commodore Uriah P. Levy". American Jewish Year Book, 1903
 The Presidents I Have Known from 1860-1918. Washington, D.C. 1918

Notes

References
  This source quotes from the Jewish Encyclopedia.

External links
 

1836 births
1923 deaths
German emigrants to the United States
American businesspeople
American Freemasons
American people of German-Jewish descent
People from Washington, D.C.
People from Kusel (district)
American consuls
People from the Palatinate (region)
Ambassadors of the United States to Egypt
People from Uhrichsville, Ohio
19th-century American lawyers